Saint Sisoës the Great (also Sisoi the Great, Sisoy the Great, Sisoes of Sceté or Shishoy; †429 AD) was an early Christian desert father, a solitary monk pursuing asceticism in the Egyptian desert in a cave of his predecessor, St Anthony the Great. St Sisoës is revered as a saint by Roman Catholic and Eastern Orthodox churches,  who consider him a wonderworker.

Sisoës was a Copt by birth. Having withdrawn the world from his youth, he retired to the desert of Sceté, and lived some time under the direction of his teacher, Abba Or. The desire of finding a retreat yet more unfrequented induced him to cross the Nile and hide himself in the mountain where St. Anthony the Great had died some time before.

See also
 Sissoi Veliky (disambiguation)

Notes

Sources

  This article contains quotations from Sisoes the Great at the Orthodox Wiki, which is available under a Attribution-ShareAlike 2.5 Generic (CC BY-SA 2.5) licence and the GNU Free Documentation License (GFDL) license.
 Venerable Sisoes the Great. OCA - Feasts and Saints.
 Great Synaxaristes : Ὁ Ὅσιος Σισώης ὁ Μέγας. 6 Ιουλίου. ΜΕΓΑΣ ΣΥΝΑΞΑΡΙΣΤΗΣ.
 Sisoes the Great and the Contemplation of Death as a Means to True Life in Christ. MYSTAGOGY: The Weblog of John Sanidopoulos. Monday, July 6, 2009.
 (Many incidents from the life of St. Sisoës can be found in the  Sayings of the Desert Fathers  (Apophthegmata to Pateron)).
 Rev. Alban Butler (1711–73). St. Sisoes or Sisoy, Anchoret in Egypt. The Lives of the Saints. Volume VII: July. 1866. (Bartleby.com).
 Rev. G.T. Stokes (D.D.). SISOË. In: William Smith and Henry Wace. A Dictionary of Christian Biography, Literature, Sects and Doctrines. Volume IV: Naamanes—Zuntfredus. London: John Murray, Albemarle Street, 1887. p. 705.
 Andrew Chugg. The Quest for the Tomb of Alexander the Great. Lulu.com, 2007.

Miracle workers
Ascetics
5th-century Byzantine monks
Egyptian hermits
Saints from Roman Egypt
5th-century Christian saints
Desert Fathers